K32 or K-32 may refer to:

 K-32 (Kansas highway)
 Gallimathias musicum, a quodlibet by Wolfgang Amadeus Mozart
 , a corvette of the Royal Navy
 , a corvette of the Swedish Navy
 , a frigate of the Israeli Navy
 Kandi K32, a Chinese pickup truck
 Riverside Airport (Kansas), closed